Kenneth J. "Ken" Smith is a former Democratic member of the Pennsylvania House of Representatives for the 112th legislative district. He was elected in 2006.

Smith attended Dunmore High School and Keystone College.

Prior to elective office, he owned Smith's Restaurant in Scranton, which has been a family-owned business since 1934.  Smith defeated incumbent Fred Belardi in the 2006 democratic primary. and easily won the general election.

It was disclosed in 2008 that the restaurant property was subject to over $27,274 in delinquent school and city property taxes. The restaurant was put up for tax sale in 2007, but received no bids. Smith paid off the tax liens on his property by May 2008. In November 2009, the Pennsylvania Department of Revenue filed a $24,762 tax lien against the restaurant, an action that Smith said was a "mistake," citing the fact that he had paid the tax bill two months prior.

References

External links
Pennsylvania House of Representatives - Kenneth J. Smith  official PA House website
Pennsylvania House Democratic Caucus - Kenneth J. Smith  official caucus website

Living people
Members of the Pennsylvania House of Representatives
People from Dunmore, Pennsylvania
Politicians from Scranton, Pennsylvania
Year of birth missing (living people)